Tibor Heffler (born 17 May 1987) is a Hungarian football player. He has a brother, Norbert Heffler, who plays for Gyirmót II.

Honours
Paksi SE 
Hungarian Second Division: Winner 2006

Club statistics

Updated to games played as of 9 August 2020.

References

HLSZ
UEFA Official Website

1987 births
Sportspeople from Dunaújváros
Hungarian people of German descent
Living people
Hungarian footballers
Association football midfielders
Association football defenders
Hungary youth international footballers
Hungary under-21 international footballers
Hungary international footballers
Paksi FC players
Fehérvár FC players
Puskás Akadémia FC players
Ceglédi VSE footballers
Budapest Honvéd FC players
FC Ajka players
Nemzeti Bajnokság I players
Nemzeti Bajnokság II players